= Time for School =

Time for School, also known as Time for School: 2003-2016, is a documentary series airing in the United States on PBS. It follows the lives of several children starting school in different areas of the world, some of whom live in areas where receiving such an education can be difficult. The documentary series spans a period of several years and is set in Afghanistan, Benin, India, Brazil, and Kenya. Time for School is also available on BBC iPlayer for over a year.
